Astala is a genus of bagworm moths in the family Psychidae. There are about seven described species in Astala.

Species
These seven species belong to the genus Astala:
 Astala confederata Grote & Robinson, 1868 c g b
 Astala edwardsi Heylaerts, 1884 c g b
 Astala hoffmanni Vazquez, 1941 c g
 Astala polingi Barnes & Benjamin, 1924 c g
 Astala tristis Schaus, 1901 c g
 Astala vigasia Schaus, 1901 c g
 Astala zacualpania Dyar, 1917 c g
Data sources: i = ITIS, c = Catalogue of Life, g = GBIF, b = Bugguide.net

References

Further reading

 
 

Psychidae
Psychidae genera